Wong Ka Man may refer to:

Wong Ka Man (table tennis), professional para table tennis player who won a Paralympic gold medal
Wong Ka Man (footballer), footballer on the Hong Kong national team
Wong Ka Man, birth name of actress Carmaney Wong
Helena Wong Kar Mun, birth name of Helena Wong (weightlifter)